Planet is a feed aggregator that runs on a web server. It creates pages with entries from the original feeds in chronological order, most recent entries first.

Etymology 
In online media a planet is a feed aggregator application designed to collect posts from the weblogs of members of an internet community and display them on a single page.

History 
Planet was written in Python and maintained by Jeff Waugh and Scott James Remnant.

There are several successors: Venus - started by Sam Ruby, Pluto - started by hackNY, a second project also named Pluto by Gerald Bauer, and most recently Moonmoon.

Design 

Planet uses Mark Pilgrim's Universal Feed Parser to process feeds in RDF, RSS and Atom format, and Tomas Styblo's htmltmpl templating engine to output static files in any format.

Released under the Python License, Planet is free software.

Adoption 

Planets are commonly associated with free and open source software projects, where they are used to collect posts from the various developers involved in projects.

See also 

 List of feed aggregators
 RSS

References

External links 
Planet Venus website
Planet Pluto (G Bauer) website
Moonmoon website

Web syndication
Web 2.0 neologisms
News aggregator software